SS Oria was a Norwegian steamer that sank on 12 February 1944, causing the death of some 4,095 Italian prisoners of war, 21 Greeks and 15 Germans. It was one of the worst maritime disasters in history, and the worst maritime disaster caused by the sinking of a single ship in the Mediterranean Sea.

Ship 
The Oria was built in 1920 by Osbourne, Graham & Co in Sunderland. At the beginning of World War II, it was part of a convoy sent to North Africa, and was in Casablanca when interned in June 1940, shortly after the German occupation of Norway. One year later the ship was requisitioned by the Vichy French, renamed Sainte Julienne, and used in the Mediterranean. In November 1942 it was formally returned to its former owner and therefore renamed Oria, but soon after it was assigned to the German company  of Hamburg.

Sinking 
In the fall of 1943, after the German invasion of the Dodecanese, the Germans had to transfer tens of thousands of Italian prisoners to mainland Greece. These transfers were made often using unseaworthy vessels, cramming prisoners onboard without any safety standard. Several ships were sunk, either by Allied attack or by accident, causing the death of thousands of prisoners.

Oria was one of the vessels used to carry Italian prisoners. On 11 February 1944, it sailed from Rhodes bound for Piraeus, carrying 4,116 Italian prisoners (43 officers, 118 non-commissioned officers and 3,955 enlisted men), 21 German soldiers (part of whom were tasked with guarding the prisoners, while others were on passage to Greece), and a crew of 22 Greeks. The next day the ship was caught by a storm and sank off Cape Sounion on the South East rocks of Patroklos island. Some tugs, arriving the next day on the scene, could only save 21 Italians, 6 Germans, the Norwegian captain and one Greek. The remains of the wreck were discovered in 1999 by Greek pro diver Aristotelis Zervoudis.

See also 
Battle of Rhodes
Battle of Kos
SS Petrella
Italian military internees
Italian ship Gaetano Donizetti
Italian ship Mario Roselli
Massacre of the Acqui Division

References

 

Maritime incidents in February 1944
1920 ships
Ships built on the River Wear
Steamships of Norway
Ships of Nortraship
World War II merchant ships of France
World War II merchant ships of Germany
World War II shipwrecks in the Aegean Sea
Troop ships of Germany